Joel B. Smith is an expert on climate change policy.

He was a coordinating lead author of the Intergovernmental Panel on Climate Change 2001 assessment report and a lead author of the 2007 assessment report (the work of the IPCC, including the contributions of many scientists, was recognised by the joint award of the 2007 Nobel Peace Prize).

He is currently a Principal at Stratus Consulting Inc., in Boulder, Colorado.

See also 
 Climate Change
 Global Warming

References 
 Joel B. Smith: profile on World Bank Blogs http://blogs.worldbank.org/team/joel-b-smith
 Joel Smith and Dennis Tirpak. "The Potential Effects Of Global Climate Change On The United States." United States Environmental Protection Agency, Report to Congress, (December 1989)
 Joel Smith. "Standardized estimates of climate change damages for the United States." Climate Change. (March 1996.)

External link 

American climatologists
Intergovernmental Panel on Climate Change lead authors
Living people
Year of birth missing (living people)